Van Dyke Parks (born January 3, 1943) is an American musician, songwriter, arranger, and record producer who has composed various film and television soundtracks. He is best known for his 1967 album Song Cycle and for his collaborations with Brian Wilson and the Beach Boys (particularly the album Smile). In addition to producing or arranging albums by Randy Newman, Harry Nilsson, Phil Ochs, Little Feat, Happy End, Ry Cooder and Joanna Newsom, Parks has worked with performers such as Syd Straw, Ringo Starr, U2, Grizzly Bear, Inara George, Kimbra, Suzy Williams, Bob Dylan and Silverchair.

Born in Hattiesburg, Mississippi, Parks spent his childhood studying clarinet, piano, and singing at the American Boychoir School in Princeton, New Jersey. He started his professional career as a child actor. During the 1950s, he worked steadily in movies and television, and in the early 1960s, he majored in music at the Carnegie Institute of Technology. After dropping out of university in 1963, he relocated to Los Angeles, where his first paid gig was arranging "The Bare Necessities" for the 1967 Disney film The Jungle Book. Following this, he involved himself with the growing West Coast music scene, subsequently playing with—or appearing on records by—acts like the Mothers of Invention, the Byrds, Judy Collins, Paul Revere & the Raiders, and Harpers Bizarre. His LP Song Cycle mixed a number of genres (including bluegrass, ragtime, and show tunes) and framed classical styles in the context of 1960s pop music. It was released to underwhelming sales, but attracted a cult following in later years.

Starting in the 1970s, Parks made repeated excursions into Afro-Caribbean music, notably on his 1972 album Discover America and on records he produced for the Esso Trinidad Steel Band and Mighty Sparrow. At the same time, he managed the audio/visual department of Warner Bros. Records, which was the earliest of its kind to produce music videos for artists. Since then, he established himself in motion pictures and over the years has directed, arranged, produced, and composed soundtracks for theatrical films and television shows such as Popeye (1980), Sesame Street Presents: Follow That Bird (1985), and The Brave Little Toaster (1987). Much of his later work has been in commissioned orchestral arrangements for lesser-known indie acts.

Early life
Born in 1943 in Hattiesburg, Mississippi, as the youngest of four children, Parks spent time in Lake Charles, Louisiana, during his childhood. His older brothers played brass instruments. His father, Richard Hill Parks, was a doctor who served as chief psychiatric officer in the Dachau liberation reprisals. Having studied with Karl Menninger, Richard's specific medical specialties were neurology and psychiatry, and he was the first doctor to admit African-American patients to a white southern hospital. Richard was also a part-time clarinetist and had a dance band to get through medical school, Dick Parks and His White Swan Serenaders. Parks's mother was a Hebraic scholar.

As Parks was growing up, there were two grand pianos in the family living room, and at age 4 he began studying the clarinet. He attended the American Boychoir School in Princeton, New Jersey, studying voice and piano, and would sing "Gershwin, Schoenberg, atonal music, everything". Parks also was a street urchin in La bohème at the Metropolitan Opera and sang the title role in Amahl and the Night Visitors at New York City Opera. During his childhood, Parks became extremely fond of old-style American music, most notably the sounds of Tin Pan Alley. This interest in Depression-era songwriting correlated heavily with his artistic goals and interests during the 1960s and beyond. He was also deeply affected by musicians Spike Jones and Les Paul, which led him to develop an interest with studio experimentation in the form of pop music. Parks has said that the first record he ever purchased may have been Dean Martin's "Memories Are Made of This."

He began his professional career as a child actor. Between 1953 and 1958, he worked steadily in films and television, including the 1956 movie The Swan, starring Grace Kelly. He appeared as Ezio Pinza's son Andrew Bonino on the NBC television show Bonino. One of his co-stars on Bonino was 14-year-old Chet Allen, who appeared as Jerry Bonino. Parks and Allen were roommates at the Boychoir School. Parks also had a recurring role as Little Tommy Manicotti (the kid from upstairs) on Jackie Gleason's The Honeymooners.

After graduating from McKeesport High School, Parks majored in music at the Carnegie Institute of Technology in Pittsburgh, Pennsylvania, where he studied with Aaron Copland from 1960 to 1963, and developed an interest in Mexican music. In 1962, Parks began studying acoustic guitar. According to Parks, he learned 50 requinto solos of Mexican boleros but gave up the prospect when he realized playing guitar had become too commonplace.

Music career

1960s

Upon dropping out of Carnegie Tech in early 1963, Parks relocated to Los Angeles with the intent of being involved with the growing West Coast beatnik subculture and to play with his older brother Carson Parks as the Steeltown Two (later enlarged to three), which eventually became the folk group the Greenwood County Singers. The group included future RCA Records producer and recording artist Rick Jarrard. Parks later said of this decision, "Going to California meant I escaped John Cage. I escaped the abstractions, the music you can't remember, the highbrow angst." The two Parks brothers performed together at various coffeehouses around San Diego, Santa Barbara, and San Francisco. One of the people in attendance at a Santa Barbara performance turned out to be future Byrds member David Crosby, who at the time remarked to friend David Lindley, "If they can get away with it, so can we." While in California, Parks attempted to land a job performing on the television show Art Linkletter's House Party but was not accepted. Parks took a short hiatus from this group, briefly moving to New England to be part of the Brandywine Singers, earning up to $3,000 a week.

In 1963, his older brother Benjamin Parks, a French horn player, was killed in an auto accident in Frankfurt while working for the US State Department in Germany, one day before his 24th birthday. Terry Gilkyson informed Parks of the news and, to help make up for it, hired Parks as an arranger for his song "The Bare Necessities", which was later featured in the Disney animated feature The Jungle Book.

Parks reacted strongly to Beatlemania. Of it, he claimed, "I lived under a billboard that said 'The Beatles is coming,' and I got the sense that it was a plague, and that it was going to have cultural implication throughout the world. ... It's almost like the vestigial functions, the appendixes of the musical life that I had just begun to have a scant association with were being excised from the body of music with the advent of folk music gone electric. So I started to learn piano." He has repeatedly stated his annoyance with contemporary pop music during the mid-1960s and the culture's increasing anglophilia, going so far as to say, "apart from Pet Sounds I didn't find anything striking coming out of the United States." However, he had a favorable opinion of Bob Dylan's The Freewheelin' Bob Dylan, and Parks has said to have been impressed with Dylan's "speaking-voice" style. Accordingly, "I also looked at his written lyrics and realized that he didn't capitalize his letters. He was trying to copy e.e. cummings and, while it was transparently imitative, I thought it was a good position."By 1964, Parks was growing more and more interested in songwriting. Parks has said that while bass player Hal Brown of the Brandywine Singers took him sightseeing around a decrepit "almost-ghost town", the two had a chance encounter with the San Francisco group the Charlatans in an old saloon. The group derided the 21-year-old Parks for his "preppy" and "square" appearance, and Parks responded by showing off a song he had recently written named "High Coin", which impressed the group so much that they asked if they could record it. Parks agreed, and the Charlatans' version of "High Coin" received much airplay in San Francisco, which established Parks within the hippie counterculture. Soon after, Parks quit the Brandywine Singers and signed an artist contract with MGM Records, for which he recorded the singles "Number Nine" and "Come to the Sunshine", which did not succeed commercially. They were both produced by Tom Wilson. Two years later, Parks's compositions written for other artists were becoming known for their lyrical wordplay and sharp imagery. Producers Lenny Waronker and Terry Melcher were reportedly obsessed with the song "High Coin" in particular, and Waronker contacted Parks to persuade him to switch to Warner Bros. Records. The two then turned their attention to a relatively unknown group, the Tikis, and transformed them into the novelty act Harpers Bizarre, which became a success for the label. Harpers Bizarre performed a few of Parks' compositions on their albums, and Parks himself appears on the recordings alongside other uncredited musician friends. During this period, Parks worked frequently as a session musician, arranger, and songwriter and became acquainted with future close friends Randy Newman, Harry Nilsson, and Beach Boys bandleader Brian Wilson. Parks also performed on the Byrds' album Fifth Dimension and declined an offer by David Crosby to join the band.

In 1965, Parks briefly joined Frank Zappa's Mothers of Invention on stage, where he was referred to as "Pinocchio." Asked why he left, Parks said, "because I didn't want to be screamed at", although he attended sessions for the Mothers' 1966 album Freak Out!. At some point, he performed at least one solo date with guitarists Steve Young and Stephen Stills as the opening act for the Lovin' Spoonful. They performed as "The Van Dyke Parks." Parks soon wrote a song for Young entitled "The All Golden." He was also later asked to join Crosby, Stills, Nash & Young but declined.

Meeting Brian Wilson

Parks initially became aware of the Beach Boys during their early popularity in the early 1960s. Speaking of them in 1995, he said, "I knew they didn't surf.…I felt some resentment about [them], and I had been a fan of Four Freshmen and 5 Trombones.…Instinctively, I was not a Beach Boy fan. 'Something really dumb about it.'" He added that, "I loved Pet Sounds, you see. I came back to love them, and thought they had done a great job. It seemed to me that they would be fine in fighting spirit to take on this challenge of wresting that trophy out of the hands of those interlopers." Parks went on to call Wilson "the biggest event of that era" but was hesitant to label him a "genius", believing Wilson to be more "a lucky guy with a tremendous amount of talent and a lot of people collaborating beautifully around him."

According to most accounts, in 1966, Parks was introduced to Wilson while attending a party held at Terry Melcher's home. Wilson biographer Peter Ames Carlin dates their meeting to mid-July, whereas music historian Keith Badman cites February. However, Parks had already met Wilson at least once before, in December 1965, when David Crosby, a mutual friend, invited him to Wilson's home in Beverly Hills.

Wilson's (since-discredited) 1991 memoir, Wouldn't It Be Nice: My Own Story, suggested that he had met Parks, or had heard of him, through an unnamed mutual friend in December 1964. Author David McGowan suggests that the friend may have been Loren Schwartz, who had supervised Wilson's first LSD trip. According to Parks, Wilson "sought me out" after he had heard about him through mutual friends, "a neighborly couple" that experimented with psychedelic drugs. "People who experimented with psychedelics—no matter who they were—were viewed as 'enlightened people,' and Brian sought out the enlightened people."

In Wilson's 1991 memoir, it was written that his first impressions of Parks was "a skinny kid with a unique perspective" and that he "had a fondness for amphetamines" at the time. Parks hesitantly confirmed this, but added, "Those were his amphetamines. They were in his medicine cabinet. I'd never had amphetamines. I was working for Brian Wilson at 3:30 AM when he wanted to have his amphetamines." It was also Parks who introduced Wilson to Beatles publicist Derek Taylor, who later became the Beach Boys' publicist for some time during the 1960s.

Smile and collapse

Unsatisfied with Pet Sounds collaborator Tony Asher's lyrics for "Good Vibrations", Wilson first asked Parks to help him rewrite the lyrics to the song; Parks declined, stating that he didn't think he could improve on them. During the recording of "Good Vibrations" in 1966, Parks claims to have suggested to Wilson while attending a session to have the cellist play triplet notes. Impressed by the results, Brian Wilson soon convinced Parks to write lyrics for the Beach Boys' next LP, the ambitious but ill-fated Smile. In preparation for the writing and recording of the album, Wilson purchased several thousand dollars' worth of marijuana and hashish for himself and his friends, including Parks.

In light of Wilson's increasingly fragile mental state, the group tensions, and his signing to Warner Bros., Parks's involvement in Smile effectively ceased after early 1967, when he left to begin work on his solo career. Giving his reasons, he said, "I walked away from the situation as soon as I realized that I was causing friction between him and his other group members, and I didn't want to be the person to do that. I thought that was Brian's responsibility to bring definition to his own life. I stepped in, perhaps, I 'took a leap before I looked'. I don't know, but that's the way I feel about it.…As soon as I found out I was entering an eat or be eaten situation... I was raised differently. I didn't want to be part of that game." Recording sessions ground to a halt soon after, as Wilson became increasingly withdrawn, and the album was shelved a few months later.

Song Cycle and aftermath

Sometime in the mid-1960s, Parks visited Frank Sinatra while working at Warner Bros. Sinatra was dispirited by the rise of rock, and was considering retirement. To help alleviate this, Parks pitched his brother Carson's song "Somethin' Stupid" as a duet for Sinatra and his daughter Nancy. Purportedly on Lee Hazlewood's advice, Sinatra recorded "Somethin' Stupid", and it became his first million-selling single. This bought credit for Parks at Warner Bros, and they proceeded to fund Parks's one single: a cover of Donovan's "Colours", from his 1965 album Fairytale. It was credited to "George Washington Brown"—a fictitious pianist from South America—purportedly to protect his family from the potential infamy of his "musical criminology". "Donovan's Colours" received an ecstatic two-page review by Richard Goldstein, which convinced the label of Parks's ability.

In 1967, Parks completed his first solo album, Song Cycle, produced by Lenny Waronker. Besides original compositions by Parks, Song Cycle includes interpretations of Randy Newman's "Vine Street", Donovan's "Colours", and the traditional "Nearer, My God, to Thee". The album's production reportedly cost more than US$35,000 (equal to US$ today), making it one of the most expensive pop albums ever recorded up to that time. It sold very poorly despite rave critical reviews but gained status as a cult album in later years. Shortly after Song Cycle, Parks released a standalone 7" single: the A-side "The Eagle and Me" backed with "On The Rolling Sea When Jesus Speak To Me", which also sold poorly.

Parks has been critical of the flower power movement, which occurred toward the end of the decade, saying "Rock became a corporate classification, just like the blues. They took off its sexual organs. Some people got paid a lot of money to bottle the rebellion of the '60s, and that's when it started to mean zero to me." He added, "To me, 1969 really suggested the death knell of the counter-culture revolution. The terrible event of Charles Manson showed the cultism of the period; I was always wary of crowds. I didn't go to Woodstock. I didn't want to be in a mudflat waiting to get into a portable toilet. I thought it was a terrible idea. So I stayed at my office at Warner Bros.…I don't even know what happened around then, for many reasons. One is I was working so hard and was too busy to really get totally turned around by what other people were doing."

The aftermath of his work on Smile and Song Cycle left Parks wanting to focus more behind-the-scenes and with lesser-known artists, such as Randy Newman and Ry Cooder, and expressed discontent with being "typecast" by his songs. The 1969 Santa Barbara oil spill was also life-altering for Parks and changed his "very reason for being". Sometime after, he met the Esso Trinidad Steel Band, a Trinidadian calypso band who had been performing with Liberace in Las Vegas. According to Parks, "I saw them as enslaved in their relationship to Liberace; I thought it was a vulgarity. I wanted to save them from their trivialization." What had begun as Parks's desire to popularize calypso at that point became his focal point, and he worked with the steel band for the next several years. Speaking about his life then, Parks stated, "My favorite group was the Esso Trinidad Steel Band, whom I worked with. I loved calypso all my life. I knew every Trinidadian in Hermosa Beach back then, there were probably about 20 families. Now there's a huge population."

During the late 1960s, Parks became one of the first owners of a prototype Moog synthesizer and recorded a number of experimental advertising jingles for various companies such as Datsun and the Ice Capades. Parks plays the Moog on the Biff Rose song "Ain't No Great Day", from Rose's second LP, Children of Light. Parks was also instrumental in the genesis of the 1970 album In a Wild Sanctuary, by the electronic outfit Beaver & Krause. While having lunch with the duo, Parks suggested that they record an ecological concept album through the use of field recordings and synthesizers. Parks and Randy Newman helped the duo get signed to the Warner Bros. label.

1970s

In 1972, Parks's travels to the West Indies inspired his second solo album, Discover America, a tribute to the islands of Trinidad and Tobago and to calypso music. Parks re-arranged and re-produced obscure songs and calypso classics. Parks also produced the album Esso for the Esso Trinidad Steel Band in 1971. It was cultivated as a tribute to Prince Bernhard, the head of the World Wildlife Fund at the time. According to Parks, "Everything was directed to making it a proper, political, green album." This direction was continued in the 1975 release Clang of the Yankee Reaper.

In the early 1970s, Parks was brought in to produce the third album by seminal Japanese folk rock band Happy End while working on Discover America at Sunset Sound Recorders. He also helped with the writing for the closing track, . Sometime after, Parks became acquainted with member Haruomi Hosono, who went on to be one of the founding members of the electronic band Yellow Magic Orchestra. Parks went on to participate in a number of Hosono-related projects.

Although Smile had dissolved in mid-1967, Parks's collaborations with Wilson had not, for the time being. He was instrumental in getting the Beach Boys signed to Reprise and contributed vocally to "A Day in the Life of a Tree" and the writing of "Sail On, Sailor." Several songs with his lyrics, written during the Smile sessions, appeared on later Beach Boys albums, including "Surf's Up," "Heroes and Villains," and "Cabinessence.'

In September 1970, Parks became head of the audio/visual department of Warner Bros. records. This department was the earliest of its kind to record videos to promote records. Parks made the department up by himself and had few employees at Warner Bros. Together they made more than a dozen promotional films documenting artists including Ry Cooder, Joni Mitchell, Randy Newman, Earth, Wind & Fire, and Captain Beefheart. They were by nature documentary films, which could be rented or bought by any accredited music school. Parks later described the department as "promotional—but they could create an income stream for musicians who were hard-pushed into tours that required drugs to sustain them." Although each production ran for about ten minutes and required at least $18,500 to create, one exception was a video for the Esso Trinidad Steel Band, which ran about forty minutes. It also happens to be one of two films known by Parks to have survived since then, the other being a promotional video for Ry Cooder.

Parks recorded only two albums during the 1970s, but he had performed on numerous albums recorded by friends who were working in or around the Los Angeles music scene—notably Harry Nilsson, whom Parks considered the "smartest guy" he had ever met in the music business. During the early 1970s, Parks dealt with prescription drug abuse. He later spoke of himself as being "dead for five years", and he spent the first half of the decade "trying to regain an interest in living." Parks later stated, "When I was head of audio-visual services and on the A&R staff at Warner Bros., a man came into my office and he had a snake and his name was Alice. Right then, I knew that my days were numbered as a person really interested in the record business." About his department during this time Parks stated, "I provided that each artist would get 25% of the net profits of the rentals or sales. It was going to be a very promising market for the artist. Warners soon grew tired of what I thought was a fair equation of participation in creative profits, and basically isolated me."

After Clang of the Yankee Reaper, Parks quit his day job at Warner Bros. and "retreated from further record interests, seeking the more gregarious plain-speaking of the film community…with no less satisfaction." He spent the next several years, and most of the 1980s, focusing more on motion picture and television projects, writing scores for high-profile films, such as Popeye, and serving as musical director for television programs such as The Billy Crystal Comedy Hour, taking on as much work as he could to stay out of unemployment.

1980s

Parks made a slight comeback in 1984 with the album Jump!, which featured songs adapted from the stories of Uncle Remus and Br'er Rabbit. The album exhibits a Broadway-style reduced orchestra with Americana additions, such as banjo, mandolin, and steel drums. Parks composed the album but did not arrange or produce it. Martin Kibbee contributed to the lyrics. Following up on the album, Parks wrote a series of children's books—Jump (with Malcolm Jones), Jump Again, and Jump On Over—based on the Br'er Rabbit tales, illustrated by Barry Moser, and loosely accompanied by Parks's own album Jump!. The books contain sheet music for selected songs from the album. Parks also published a book called Fisherman & His Wife in 1991, which came packaged with a cassette.

By 1984, Parks was refused future collaborations with Wilson, instead being informed by an unnamed representative that "Mike Love is Brian Wilson's exclusive collaborator." Though Parks worked with the other Beach Boys on songs such as on "Kokomo" and the album Summer in Paradise, he did not work together with Wilson until a few years later, during the aborted album Sweet Insanity.

He wrote "City Of Light", "It's A B-Movie", "Cutting Edge", and "Worthless", all of which were used in the film The Brave Little Toaster, directed by Jerry Rees. During the 1980s and 1990s, Parks grew considerably more active in arranging and producing albums by independent artists, which inspired him to return more fully to the music business.

Following Jump!, in 1989 Warner Brothers released Tokyo Rose. This concept album focuses on the history of Japanese-U.S. relations from the 19th century to the "trade war" at the time of its release. The songs are pop tunes with an orchestral treatment including Japanese instruments and old Parks Caribbean favorites like steel drums. The album did not sell well and was not widely noticed by critics. To promote the album, he performed some shows in Japan with musicians such as Haruomi Hosono, Syd Straw, harmonicist Tommy Morgan, and steelpan player Yann Tomita.

1990s

Between 1992 and 1995, Parks teamed up again with a then-reclusive Brian Wilson to create the album Orange Crate Art. Parks wrote all of the songs on the album, except "This Town Goes Down at Sunset" and George Gershwin's instrumental "Lullaby", with vocals by Wilson. Orange Crate Art is a tribute to the Southern California of the early 1900s and a lyrical tribute to the beauty of Northern California. It was recorded during a stressful period for Wilson, after being involved in court orders relating to years of psychiatric misconduct to which he had been subject. According to Parks, "When I found him, he was alone in a room staring at a television. It was off." The album was met with poor commercial reception, much to the disappointment of Parks.

1998 saw the release of Parks's first live album, Moonlighting: Live at the Ash Grove, which shows a love of the work of 19th-century American pianist Louis Moreau Gottschalk, as well as performances of several of Parks' better-known and lesser-known songs. The live ensemble includes Sid Page as concertmaster.

2000s

Parks's association with Australian rock band Silverchair began with his work on their fourth studio album Diorama in 2002. Parks was attracted to the music of lead singer and guitarist Daniel Johns and has stated that what most attracted him to the band was Johns' courage. He composed orchestral arrangements for Silverchair's fifth album Young Modern album in 2007. Johns traveled to Prague with Parks to have the arrangements recorded by the Czech Philharmonic Orchestra. The album's title is a nickname Parks uses for Johns.

Parks was contacted by Wilson in 2003 to help with preparing a live performance of Smile. He agreed, and the duo re-recorded the album and then presented it on a world tour, beginning with the world premiere performance at the Royal Festival Hall in London, which Parks attended. Parks later provided some lyrics to That Lucky Old Sun, released in 2008. The album once again featured almost completely new compositions written by Brian Wilson, but with minimum input from Parks compared to the previous Smile collaboration.

Parks worked with Inara George on a record released in 2008, An Invitation, and they performed two songs together on January 8, 2008, at the Walt Disney Concert Hall in Los Angeles, as part of the program Concrete Frequency: Songs of the City.

In 2009, Parks performed in The People Speak, a documentary feature film that uses dramatic and musical performances of the letters, diaries, and speeches of everyday Americans, based on historian Howard Zinn's A People's History of the United States. Parks performed with Bob Dylan and Ry Cooder on the documentary broadcast on December 13, 2009, on the History Channel. They played "Do Re Mi" and reportedly a couple of other Guthrie songs that were excluded from the final edit.

2010s

In 2010, Parks stated "At this point, I don't have an album in me. But I have some songs, so I'm putting them out as 45 rpm stereo records this summer." Between 2011 and 2012, Parks issued six double-sided singles, which featured new original songs, collaborations, unreleased archival recordings, re-recordings of older tracks, and covers. The singles also featured guest spots from singers Gaby Moreno and Inara George of The Bird and the Bee. Parks has also stressed the importance of the singles' artwork, contributed by visual artists such as Klaus Voormann, Ed Ruscha, and Art Spiegelman. Artist Charles Ray also sculpted two life-size statues of Parks.

In August 2011, Parks was contacted by electronic musician Skrillex, who requested that he supply orchestral arrangements. His arranging work was released in December 2011 as the iTunes-exclusive bonus track "Skrillex Orchestral Suite by Varien" on the Bangarang EP. Parks admitted in 2013:

In November 2011, after 44 years, a compilation box set of the Beach Boys' Smile sessions was finally released by Capitol Records. Parks was personally absent from The Smile Sessions advertising campaign and liner notes, and refused to comment on the box set, despite initially giving his approval. In promotional interviews for The Smile Sessions and the Beach Boys' 50th Reunion Tour, Mike Love suggested that Smile collapsed due to substance abuse, and that the project was heavily influenced by Parks' drug use. One interview included an off-the-cuff comment by Brian Wilson saying that it was Parks who introduced him to LSD and amphetamines, something Parks has previously denied. Later in 2011, Parks formally responded to these claims via his web site in a post that accused Love of Mammon and historical revisionism. In February 2013, The Smile Sessions went on to win the Grammy Award for Best Historical Album.

While in Tokyo in January 2013, Parks performed with Haruomi Hosono for the first time in years. In March 2013, Parks announced the release of Songs Cycled, which compiled his six 2011–12 singles into one LP. It was Parks' first full album of relatively new material since 1995's Orange Crate Art. The album was released on May 6, 2013 through Bella Union. Also in March, Parks performed at the 2013 Adelaide Festival with Daniel Johns and Kimbra. In September 2013, Parks curated a "Best-of" CD by New Orleans pianist/composer Tom McDermott entitled Bamboula. Parks memorialized the 50th anniversary of the 1963 Kennedy assassination by releasing a new original composition entitled "I'm History" on November 22.

Parks underwent unsuccessful hand surgery in 2014, causing his hands to freeze after about forty minutes of playing piano. On May 9, 2015, Parks performed what he called his "final piano performance" at the Largo in Los Angeles. Guest performers included singer Gaby Moreno; songwriter-producer Joe Henry; Grizzly Bear's Edward Droste; New Zealand singer-songwriter Kimbra; and jazz guitarist-composer Grant Geissman. Of upcoming projects Parks said: "[It will] set poetry to music, to underscore poems. So I will still be performing once I get that done. I will be looking to find a celebrated string quartet to take things to an irreducible minimum. I can pick up a quartet in Peoria, or in Europe, to perform something like this. I also hope to find a film project that interests me."

Film and television work
Parks has also scored much music for feature-length motion pictures and television series, including Sesame Streets Follow That Bird, Jack Nicholson's The Two Jakes and Goin' South, Casual Sex?, Private Parts, Popeye (with Harry Nilsson), and The Company, and for the Pee-Wee's Playhouse Christmas Special.

Parks had four songs featured in the animated film The Brave Little Toaster (1987). He worked closely with David Newman on the film's score as well. He composed the theme song for Rudy Maxa's Savvy Traveler radio program on NPR.

Parks composed the faux-psychedelic song "Black Sheep" (a parody of Smile and Brian Wilson's style in general) for Walk Hard: The Dewey Cox Story, sung by John C. Reilly, who portrays the titular character.

Parks has taken small television and film roles including appearances in Popeye, The Two Jakes, and as Leo Johnson's defense attorney Jack Racine in episode #2005 of Twin Peaks. The HBO Family series Harold and the Purple Crayon, is narrated by Sharon Stone with music and lyrics written and sung by Parks. He and David Mansfield are co-credited with the music for the 2006 miniseries Broken Trail (2006).

Discography

Studio albums
 Song Cycle (1967)
 Discover America (1972)
 Clang of the Yankee Reaper (1975)
 Jump! (1984)
 Tokyo Rose (1989)
 Orange Crate Art (1995) (with Brian Wilson)
 Songs Cycled (2013)

Live album
 Moonlighting: Live at the Ash Grove (1998)

Compilations
 Idiosyncratic Path: Best Of Van Dyke Parks (1996)
 Arrangements: Volume 1 (2011)
 Super Chief: Music For The Silver Screen (2013)

Filmography

Film

Television

ReferencesBibliography'

External links
 
 
 
 musicOMH interview with Van Dyke Parks, 2011
 Welcome to Bananastan! The Van Dyke Parks Bananastan Archive
 80-minute 1984 KCRW radio interview by Bob Claster A Visit with Van Dyke Parks
 Van Dyke Parks on creativity, an interview with about-creativity.com May 3, 2007
 

1943 births
20th-century American male actors
20th-century American musicians
20th-century pianists
American male child actors
American entertainment industry businesspeople
Record producers from California
Brian Wilson
Living people
Musicians from Hattiesburg, Mississippi
People from Ventura County, California
Songwriters from Mississippi
Experimental pop musicians
Baroque pop musicians
Art pop musicians
People from Lake Charles, Louisiana
American music arrangers
Bella Union artists